Pushkino is a rural locality (a village) in Bedeyevo-Polyansky Selsoviet, Blagoveshchensky District, Bashkortostan, Russia. The population was 83 as of 2010. There is one street.

Geography 
Pushkino is located 47 km northeast of Blagoveshchensk (the district's administrative centre) by road. Bedeyeva Polyana is the nearest rural locality.

References 

Rural localities in Blagoveshchensky District